Rab5 GDP/GTP exchange factor is a protein that in humans is encoded by the RABGEF1 gene.

RABGEF1 forms a complex with rabaptin-5 (RABPT5; MIM 603616) that is required for endocytic membrane fusion, and it serves as a specific guanine nucleotide exchange factor for RAB5(RAB5A; MIM 179512) (Horiuchi et al., 1997) [supplied by OMIM].

References

Further reading